Utricularia calycifida is a small to medium-sized terrestrial perennial carnivorous plant that belongs to the genus Utricularia. U. calycifida is endemic to northern South America and can be found in Brazil, Guyana, Suriname, and Venezuela.

Utricularia calycifida is frequently grown by carnivorous plant specialists. Because of its large leaves and variations in flower color and size, several cultivars of this species have been established, e.g. Utricularia 'Lavinia Whateley', U. 'Cthulhu', U. 'Yog-Sothoth', U. 'Mrs. Marsh,' and U. 'Asenath Waite.' These names are based upon characters in the novels and short stories of H. P. Lovecraft.

See also 
 List of Utricularia species

References

External links 
 New Cultivars - Carnivorous Plant Newsletter Volume 29, Number 1, March 2000, pages 14 - 21
 Galleria Carnivora - Utricularia
 Focusing on U. calycifida--a Variable Species (Carnivorous Plant Newsletter, 1992, 21:1, 9.)

Carnivorous plants of South America
Flora of Brazil
Flora of Guyana
Flora of Suriname
Flora of Venezuela
calycifida